Sir Charles Kennedy  (12 October 1831 – 25 October 1908) was a senior British diplomat.

Early life
Charles Malcolm Kennedy was born in London, the son of James Kennedy, Member of Parliament for Tiverton, and was educated at Blundell's School in Tiverton and at Caius College at Cambridge (where he took two firsts).

Diplomatic career
Kennedy entered the Foreign Office in 1852. He served chiefly in the commercial branch, attaining the senior clerkship there early in the 1870s. This was his substantive appointment for many years, but he was almost constantly engaged on special services abroad, in particular:
His first deputation (1870–71) was to the Levant as president of a commission of inquiry into the Consular establishments
British Commissioner in Paris in connection with the Treaty of Commerce and Navigation (concluded with the newly established republic in 1872)
On several occasions questions relating to interchange of commerce between Great Britain and France took him to Paris, the last of them being when he assisted Sir Charles Dilke then Under-Foreign Secretary, to negotiate the subsisting Treaty.
In conjunction with Sir Edward Malet, the arrangements with Italy in 1875 for the renewal of the commercial treaty signed eight years before.
The Joint Channel Tunnel Commission
Commission of commerce and industry at Brussels in 1880
Senior British delegate to the North Sea Fisheries Conference in 1881 at The Hague (and was appointed plenipotentiary for the signature of the resulting Convention)
Senior British delegate to various international conferences on the protection of submarine cables held in Paris from 1882 to 1886 (Kennedy contributing powerfully to the resulting settlement)
Representing Great Britain at a conference at The Hague for the restriction of the liquor traffic in the North Sea
Representing Great Britain in the negotiations in Paris regarding the Channel Fisheries.

Later life
Kennedy was appointed Knight of the Order of St Michael and St George in 1893, and retired from the public service in the following year. About this time he was appointed Commander of the Order of Leopold.

From 1895 to 1902 Kennedy was lecturer on international Law at University College, Bristol, a number of those lectures being published.

Many years earlier he had edited "Kennedy's Ethnological and Linguistic Essays" and he was also chairman of the Exmouth School Board from 1896 to the dissolution of separate school authorities under Balfour's Act of 1902, and an active member of the council of the Society of Arts.

References 

Obituary of Sir Charles Kennedy, The Times, 26 October 1908 (pg. 11; Issue 38787; col C)

External links

1831 births
1908 deaths
People educated at Blundell's School
Alumni of Gonville and Caius College, Cambridge
British diplomats

Knights Commander of the Order of St Michael and St George
Companions of the Order of the Bath